Arseny Nikolayevich Bibikov (1873 — 1927) was a writer, film and stage actor, poet. Bibikov played in almost 50 films.

Selected filmography 
 1910 — The Idiot
 1914 — The Girl from the Street
 1915 — Children of the Age
 1916 — Mirages
 1918 — Hero of the spirit

References

External links 
 АРСЕНИЙ БИБИКОВ

Male actors from the Russian Empire
Writers from the Russian Empire
Poets from the Russian Empire
1873 births
1927 deaths
Soviet male actors